MV Norris Castle was built, in 1942, by Alexander Finlay & Co in Glasgow. She was originally constructed as a tank landing craft, LCT 828, for the Normandy landings. Acquired in 1947 by Red Funnel, she made her first service voyage on 23 July 1948 and operated as a car ferry until sold in 1962. As she could load from both the front and side, she was used on the Southampton to East Cowes service. Norris Castle made her last sailing for Red Funnel on 16 March 1962.

After withdrawal from service in 1962, she was sold to Compania Maritima Santa Kynaki SA for further service in the Greek Islands. The same year ownership was passed to D Filipopulous and she was renamed Aghios Dionisios. In 2000, she was renamed Galina S by her new owners, the National Shipping Company, and registered in Honduras. She still appeared on Lloyds Register in 2008–09, though with no details of ownership or registration.

References

Bibliography
 

Ferries of England
Ferry transport on the Isle of Wight
1942 ships
Ships of Red Funnel